Nothobranchius kilomberoensis is a species of killifish in the family Nothobranchiidae. It is endemic to Tanzania where it is found in the floodplain of the Kilombero River where it is found in turbid, seasonal pools.

References

Links
 Nothobranchius kilomberoensis on WildNothos 

kilomberoensis
Fish of Tanzania
Endemic fauna of Tanzania
Taxonomy articles created by Polbot
Fish described in 2002